Alta Italia is a village and rural locality (municipality) in Realicó Department in La Pampa Province in Argentina.

Population
The village had 1,300 inhabitants at the 2001 census, representing a 12.26% population increase over the 1,158 inhabitants recorded in the 1991 census.

References

Populated places in La Pampa Province